Henry Richard Enfield (born 30 May 1961) is an English comedian, actor, writer and director.  He is known in particular for his television work, including Harry Enfield's Television Programme and Harry & Paul, and for the creation and portrayal of comedy characters such as Kevin the Teenager, Loadsamoney, Smashie and Nicey, The Scousers, Tim Nice-But-Dim and Mr. "You Don't Want to Do It Like That".

Early life
Born in Horsham, Sussex, he is the eldest of four children (and only son) of English television, radio and newspaper journalist and presenter Edward Enfield and his wife, Deirdre Jenkins.

The Enfield family are descendants of the nineteenth-century philanthropist Edward Enfield. He was educated at the independent Arundale School in Pulborough, Dorset House School, Worth School, Collyer's Sixth Form College (all in West Sussex) and the University of York, where he was a member of Derwent College and studied politics. He squatted in Hackney and worked for a while as a milkman.

Career

Enfield first came to wide public attention when appearing on Channel 4's Saturday Live as several different characters created with Paul Whitehouse. These quickly entered the national consciousness. Among these characters were Stavros, a Greek kebab shop owner with fractured English; and Loadsamoney, an obnoxious plasterer who constantly boasted about how much money he earned. The Loadsamoney character was created in reaction to the policies of the Thatcher government of the day, and took on a life of its own, sampling the songs "Money, Money" from the musical Cabaret and "Money, Money, Money" by ABBA to spawn a hit single in 1988 and a sell-out live tour. In May 1988, Labour Party leader Neil Kinnock used the term loadsamoney to criticise the policies of the Conservative government and journalists began to refer to the "loadsamoney mentality" and the "loadsamoney economy".

As a foil to Loadsamoney, Enfield and Whitehouse created the Geordie "Bugger-All-Money" and in 1988 Enfield appeared as both characters during the Nelson Mandela 70th Birthday Tribute Concert at Wembley Stadium. In time Whitehouse and Enfield became disturbed that Loadsamoney was being seen in a positive light, rather than as a satirical figure, and they had him run over during a Comic Relief Red Nose Day show while leaving the studio after presenting host Lenny Henry with "the biggest cheque of the night"—a physically huge cheque for ten pence. Enfield created "Tory Boy", a character which portrayed a young male Conservative Member of Parliament (MP).

In 1989, Enfield realised a personal project, Norbert Smith - a Life, a spoof on British theatrical knights "slumming" in the film industry. He also provided voices for the British satirical puppet show Spitting Image, and starred as Dirk Gently in the BBC Radio adaptations of Dirk Gently's Holistic Detective Agency and The Long Dark Tea-Time of the Soul.

TV series

In 1990, Enfield developed his BBC sketch show Harry Enfield's Television Programme, later retitled Harry Enfield & Chums, with Whitehouse and Kathy Burke. Eschewing the alternative comedy style prevalent at the time, both versions of the show were indebted to comedians such as Dick Emery and Morecambe and Wise. Enfield and his co-performers created another group of nationally recognised characters for these shows, such as Stan and Pam Herbert, who use the catchphrase "We are considerably richer than you" (in an exaggerated West-Midlands accent), Tim Nice-But-Dim, The Scousers, Smashie and Nicey, Wayne and Waynetta Slob, Annoying Kid Brother, who grew into Kevin the Teenager, and two old-fashioned presenters, Mr Cholmondley-Warner and Grayson.

In 1991, Enfield played Dermot in the sitcom Men Behaving Badly along with Martin Clunes, Caroline Quentin and Leslie Ash, originally on Thames Television. Enfield left after the first series, and was replaced in the second series by Neil Morrissey as Tony. Enfield is a professed fan of opera and fronted a Channel 4 documentary series on the subject. In 1991 Harry also starred in the series Gone to the Dogs as Little Jim.

After a short break from television, Enfield signed a new contract with BSkyB, but produced only one series, Harry Enfield's Brand Spanking New Show. In 2002 Enfield returned to the BBC with Celeb, a new series based on the comic strip of the same title in Private Eye, as the ageing rockstar Gary Bloke.

In 2002, Enfield was the first guest on the revamped version of BBC's Top Gear where he did a 2 minutes 1 second lap. He also appeared on the show on 23 November 2008.  Enfield has also narrated various TV documentaries such as the Discovery Wings channel "Classic British Aircraft".

In 2007, he played Jim Stonem in the Channel 4 series Skins. He reprised this role in the second series in 2008, and the third series in 2009. Enfield directed two episodes of Skins in season two entitled "Chris" and "Tony" in 2008. He appears often on mainstream television shows. His comedy series Harry & Paul (originally titled Ruddy Hell! It's Harry & Paul) started in 2007.

In September 2013 Enfield appeared in the BBC Three comedy series Bad Education as Martin, the father of Jack Whitehall's character Alfie. In October 2014, Enfield and Paul Whitehouse returned to the characters of Frank and George in a sketch for Channel 4's testicular cancer awareness comedy show "The Feeling Nuts Comedy Night".

In August 2015, Enfield, alongside Whitehouse, in celebration of their 25-year partnership, presented An Evening With Harry Enfield and Paul Whitehouse 

In 2016, he appeared as John Shakespeare, father of William Shakespeare, in the sitcom Upstart Crow.

Between 2016 and 2020, Enfield appeared as Prince Charles in the Channel 4 sitcom The Windsors.

Films 
In 2000, Enfield appeared in his first leading film role playing Kevin alongside Kathy Burke, who played the character's (male) friend Perry—roles originally created for Enfield's television series—in Kevin & Perry Go Large. The film charted the pair's attempt to become professional DJs by travelling to the nightclubs of Ibiza and pestering their idol, the DJ Eyeball Paul, played by Rhys Ifans, while gaining love and losing their virginity. Enfield also appeared as King George VI in Churchill: The Hollywood Years (2004), a satire on Hollywood's tendency to change elements of history. In 2012, he starred with Simon Callow in the film Acts of Gordfrey, which opened in UK cinemas on 27 January.

He reprised his role as Martin in The Bad Education Movie, released on 21 August 2015. He appeared as Bill in the 2015 film Scottish Mussel.

In 2015 Enfield and Jessica Hynes appeared as Mr and Mrs Jackson in a BBC film of the Arthur Ransome children's novel Swallows and Amazons.

In 2022, Enfield appeared as Tony Blair in the made-for-television biographical musical comedy film Prince Andrew: The Musical.

Video games 

In 2012, a likeness of his character Loadsamoney, named "Harold Lott", was released as a DLC skin for the game Killing Floor.

A sample of the character 'Loadsamoney' (Shut Your Mouth and Look at my Wad) is used in the 1989 Game Blood Money.

Commercials 

Enfield appeared in some television commercials before becoming famous, including one made in 1987 for Tetley. Enfield's commercials include a series made in 1994 for Dime Bar. One commercial in this series had Enfield as a yokel refusing a Dime bar—smooth on the outside, crunchy on the inside—because he preferred armadillos—smooth on the inside, crunchy on the outside. Later Enfield, with Paul Whitehouse, starred in a series of commercials for Hula Hoops as The Self-Righteous Brothers, characters from Enfield's television show. In 2004 Enfield starred in a series of commercials for Burger King in Paraguay as Dr Angus, a character intended to promote the company's newest hamburger. Two more characters from Enfield's TV series, Mr Cholmondley-Warner and Grayson, also appeared in commercials, for Mercury Communications. Also in 2004 Enfield provided the voice of "The Roaming Gnome" character used in Travelocity's U.S. advertising campaign. Enfield was also in commercials for Worthington Bitter.

Music 

Enfield made a cameo appearance as 'the tea lady' during Blur's performance at the Olympics Closing Ceremony Celebration Concert in London's Hyde Park in 2012.

He also appeared alongside Albarn's other project The Good, the Bad & the Queen as compere during a live performance at The Tower of London on 9 July 2007.

Theatre 
In 2021, Enfield starred as Prince Charles in the Windsors: Endgame at the Prince of Wales theatre in London. The show was on for a limited time and closed on 9th October 2021.

Discography

Personal life 
In 1997, Enfield married Lucy Lyster; they have three children. It was announced in August 2020 that the couple had separated.

References

External links 

 
 'Look, Listen and Take Heed'

 
1961 births
Living people
English male comedians
English male film actors
English male television actors
English television writers
People from Horsham
20th-century squatters
Alumni of the University of York
People educated at The College of Richard Collyer
People educated at Worth School
British sketch comedians
20th-century English comedians
British male comedy actors
British male film actors
British male television writers
Audiobook narrators